Cayuga is a Northern Iroquoian language of the Iroquois Proper (also known as "Five Nations Iroquois") subfamily, and is spoken on Six Nations of the Grand River First Nation, Ontario, by around 240 Cayuga people, and on the Cattaraugus Reservation, New York, by fewer than 10.

The Cayuga language is related to other Northern Iroquoian languages, such as Seneca. It is considered critically endangered, with only 55 people of the Indigenous population reporting Cayuga as their mother tongue in the 2016 Canadian census. However, Cayuga members are making efforts to revitalize the language. (See also Indigenous Languages in Canada.) As an example of such, Six Nations Polytechnic has developed apps on IOS and study programs in Cayuga, Oneida, Mohawk and others.

Dialects
There are at least two distinct dialects of Cayuga. Two are spoken at Six Nations of the Grand River in southern Ontario. Another, called "Seneca-Cayuga", was spoken in Oklahoma until its extinction in the 1980s.

The two dialects of the Cayuga at Six Nations are often associated with the two Cayuga longhouses, Sour Springs or “Upper” Cayuga and “Lower” Cayuga. Differences between these two dialects of southern Ontario are known to include two phonological patterns. In the Lower Cayuga (LC) variety, underlying *tj sequences surface as /ky/, e.g. LC gyę:gwa’ /kjɛ̃ːkwaʔ/ vs (UC) ję:gwa’ /tjɛ̃ːkwaʔ/. Another apparent difference involves the metrical pattern of Laryngeal Spreading. In Lower Cayuga words, odd-numbered vowels preceding /h/ or /ʔ/ are pronounced with the voice quality of the following consonant. That is to say, such vowels are pronounced with whispered vowels when preceding /h/ or creaky voice before /ʔ/. An example of this occurs in the word for ‘nine,’ gyoHdo̜h [kjo̤htõh].

Phonology

Modern dialects
There are two varieties of Cayuga. The Lower Cayuga dialect is spoken by those of the Lower End of the Six Nations and the Upper Cayuga are from the Upper End.  The main difference between the two is that the Lower Cayuga use the sound  and the Upper use the sound .   Also, pronunciation differs between individual speakers of Cayuga and their preferences.

Vowels

The latter is not phonemic, but surfaces due to a phonological pattern of nasalization, where underlying /a/ becomes  when following a nasal vowel.

Vowels can be devoiced as  allophonically, indicated in the orthography used at Six Nations by underlining them.

Long vowels
Length is important because it alone can distinguish two completely different meanings from one another. For example:
[haʔseʔ] you are going
[haʔseː] you went

Devoiced vowels
Following are some words that demonstrate what some vowels sound like when they occur before [h]. The consonant before the nasalized vowel becomes voiceless.

Consonants

Allophonic variations that occur in Cayuga:
 becomes voiced  before sonorants. The sound [d] does not exist word-finally. 
 becomes voiced  before sonorants.

Speakers may use  and  interchangeably according to the speaker's preference.

 can also be voiceless  (sounds like  followed by )

: "A vowel devoices if the vowel and a following  are in an odd-numbered syllable."

The vowel is voiced when it and a following  are in an even-numbered syllable and in "absolute word-initial position or in word-final position, or preceded by another ." For example:  'tell her' 
   'she writes'

Accent
Most words have accented vowels, resulting in a higher pitch. Where the stress is placed is dependent on the "position of the word in the phrase." The default location for stress for nouns is on final vowel. "In words that are at the end of a phrase, accent falls on the 2nd last vowel, the 3rd last vowel, or occasionally, on the 4th vowel from the end of the word." For example:

  'I just heard it'  

These sounds are long, especially in an even-numbered position. When nouns and verbs are not at the end of a phrase, accent is placed on the final vowel. For example:

  'I heard it, I didn't see it'

Morphosyntax

Cayuga is a polysynthetic language. As with other Iroquoian languages, the verbal template contains an optional prepronominal prefix, a pronominal prefix (indicating agreement), an optional incorporated noun, a verbal root, and an aspectual suffix. The nominal template consists of an agreement prefix (usually neuter for non-possessed nouns), the nominal root, and a suffix.

Notes

References
 Froman, Frances, Alfred Keye, Lottie Keye and Carrie Dyck. English-Cayuga/Cayuga-English Dictionary. Toronto: University of Toronto Press, 2002.

Further reading
 Henry, Reginald and Marianne Mithun. Watęwayęstanih: A Cayuga Teaching Grammar. Brantford, Ontario:  Woodland Indian Cultural Educational Centre.

 Dyck, Carrie, Frances Froman, Alfred Keye & Lottie Keye. LIN 6050 Structure of Cayuga. Course Package.. Ms. Memorial University of NL and Woodland Cultural Centre.

External links
Cayuga: Our Oral Legacy (COOL)
Cayuga: Our Oral Legacy (COOL)(NEW)
Cayuga at LanguageGeek
Ohwęjagehká: Ha’degaénage: Cayuga
Sgę́nǫ’ Ga[?]hnawiyo'geh! - How to say "hello" in Cayuga

OLAC resources in and about the Cayuga language

Cayuga
Northern Iroquoian languages
Indigenous languages of the North American eastern woodlands
First Nations languages in Canada
Indigenous languages of Oklahoma
Endangered Iroquoian languages
Native American language revitalization